Lead(IV) oxide, commonly known as lead dioxide, is the inorganic compound with the formula PbO2.  It is an oxide where lead is in an oxidation state of +4. It is a dark-brown solid which is insoluble in water. It exists in two crystalline forms. It has several important applications in electrochemistry, in particular as the positive plate of lead acid batteries.

Properties

Physical

Lead dioxide has two major polymorphs, alpha and beta, which occur naturally as rare minerals scrutinyite and plattnerite, respectively. Whereas the beta form had been identified in 1845, α-PbO2 was first identified in 1946 and found as a naturally occurring mineral 1988.

The alpha form has orthorhombic symmetry, space group Pbcn (No. 60), Pearson symbol oP12, lattice constants a = 0.497 nm, b = 0.596 nm, c = 0.544 nm, Z = 4 (four formula units per unit cell). The lead atoms are six-coordinate. 

The symmetry of the beta form is tetragonal, space group P42/mnm (No. 136), Pearson symbol tP6, lattice constants a = 0.491 nm, c = 0.3385 nm, Z = 2 and related to the rutile structure and can be envisaged as containing columns of octahedra sharing opposite edges and joined to other chains by corners. This contrasts with the alpha form where the octahedra are linked by adjacent edges to give zigzag chains.

Chemical
Lead dioxide decomposes upon heating in air as follows:
24 PbO2 → 2 Pb12O19 + 5 O2
Pb12O19 → Pb12O17 + O2
2 Pb12O17 → 8 Pb3O4 + O2
2 Pb3O4 → 6 PbO + O2 

Therefore, thermal decomposition of lead dioxide is a common way of producing various lead oxides.

Lead dioxide is an amphoteric compound with prevalent acidic properties. It dissolves in strong bases to form the hydroxyplumbate ion, [Pb(OH)6]2−:
PbO2 + 2 NaOH + 2 H2O   →  Na2[Pb(OH)6]

It also reacts with basic oxides in the melt, yielding orthoplumbates M4[PbO4].

Because of the instability of its Pb4+ cation, lead dioxide reacts with hot acids, converting to the more stable Pb2+ state and liberating oxygen:
2 PbO2 + 2 H2SO4 → 2 PbSO4 + 2 H2O  +  O2
2 PbO2 + 4 HNO3 → 2 Pb(NO3)2 + 2 H2O + O2
PbO2 + 4 HCl →  PbCl2 + 2 H2O + Cl2

However these reactions are slow.

Lead dioxide is well known for being a good oxidizing agent, with an example reactions listed below:
2 MnSO4 + 5 PbO2 + 6 HNO3 → 2 HMnO4 + 2 PbSO4 + 3 Pb(NO3)2 + 2 H2O
2 Cr(OH)3 + 10 KOH + 3 PbO2 → 2 K2CrO4 + 3 K2PbO2 + 8 H2O

Electrochemical
Although the formula of lead dioxide is nominally given as PbO2, the actual oxygen to lead ratio varies between 1.90 and 1.98 depending on the preparation method. Deficiency of oxygen (or excess of lead) results in the characteristic metallic conductivity of lead dioxide, with a resistivity as low as 10−4 Ω·cm and which is exploited in various electrochemical applications. Like metals, lead dioxide has a characteristic electrode potential, and in electrolytes it can be polarized both anodically and cathodically. Lead dioxide electrodes have a dual action, that is both the lead and oxygen ions take part in the electrochemical reactions.

Production

Chemical processes
Lead dioxide is produced commercially by several methods, which include oxidation of red lead (Pb3O4) in alkaline slurry in a chlorine atmosphere, reaction of lead(II) acetate with "chloride of lime" (calcium hypochlorite), The reaction of Pb3O4 with nitric acid also affords the dioxide:
Pb3O4 + 4 HNO3 → PbO2 + 2 Pb(NO3)2 + 2 H2O

PbO2 reacts with sodium hydroxide to form the hexahydroxoplumbate(IV) ion [Pb(OH)6]2−, soluble in water.

Electrolysis
An alternative synthesis method is electrochemical: lead dioxide forms on pure lead, in dilute sulfuric acid, when polarized anodically at electrode potential about +1.5 V at room temperature. This procedure is used for large-scale industrial production of PbO2 anodes. Lead and copper electrodes are immersed in sulfuric acid flowing at a rate of 5–10 L/min. The electrodeposition is carried out galvanostatically, by applying a current of about 100 A/m2 for about 30 minutes.

The drawback of this method for the production of lead dioxide anodes is its softness, especially compared to the hard and brittle PbO2 which has a Mohs hardness of 5.5. This mismatch in mechanical properties results in peeling of the coating which is preferred for bulk PbO2 production. Therefore, an alternative method is to use harder substrates, such as titanium, niobium, tantalum or graphite and deposit PbO2 onto them from lead(II) nitrate in static or flowing nitric acid. The substrate is usually sand-blasted before the deposition to remove surface oxide and contamination and to increase the surface roughness and adhesion of the coating.

Applications
Lead dioxide is used in the production of matches, pyrotechnics, dyes and the curing of sulfide polymers. It is also used in the construction of high-voltage lightning arresters.

Lead dioxide is used as an anode material in electrochemistry. β-PbO2 is more attractive for this purpose than the α form because it has relatively low resistivity, good corrosion resistance even in low-pH medium, and a high overvoltage for the evolution of oxygen in sulfuric- and nitric-acid-based electrolytes. Lead dioxide can also withstand chlorine evolution in hydrochloric acid. Lead dioxide anodes are inexpensive and were once used instead of conventional platinum and graphite electrodes for regenerating potassium dichromate. They were also applied as oxygen anodes for electroplating copper and zinc in sulfate baths. In organic synthesis, lead dioxide anodes were applied for the production of glyoxylic acid from oxalic acid in a sulfuric acid electrolyte.

Lead acid battery 
The most important use of lead dioxide is as the cathode of lead acid batteries. Its utility arises from the anomalous metallic conductivity of PbO2. The lead acid battery stores and releases energy by shifting the equilibrium (a comproportionation) between metallic lead, lead dioxide, and lead(II) salts in sulfuric acid. 
Pb + PbO2 + 2  + 2 H+ → 2 PbSO4 + 2 H2O  E° = +2.05 V

Safety
Lead compounds are poisons. Lead dioxide is a strong oxidizer, so any contact of skin, eyes with either lead dioxide or its vapours may cause severe injury in the form of burns which can even lead to death. 

PbO2 is not combustible, but it enhances flammability of other substances and the intensity of the fire. In case of a fire it gives off irritating and toxic fumes.

Lead dioxide and other lead compound pose a huge environmental hazard when they are not disposed of properly. it is especially poisonous to aquatic life.

References

External links
National Pollutant Inventory: Lead and Lead Compounds Fact Sheet

Oxides
Lead(IV) compounds
Acidic oxides
Pyrotechnic oxidizers
Oxidizing agents